Stephanie Lynne Mason is a New York City-based theater actress. She has performed on Broadway as well as in other theatrical productions.

Stephanie Lynne made her Broadway debut as swing in the 2015 revival of Fiddler on the Roof which opened November 12, 2015 and closed December 31, 2016 for a total of 431 performances. She also performed in Axis Theater Company's Evening 1910 which opened May 8, 2016 and performed for 3 weeks closing May 28, 2016 . She played Dyanne in the national tour of Million Dollar Quartet, a jukebox musical celebrating early rock and roll stars, in September 2016.

Stephanie Lynne has also performed with the National Yiddish Theater – Folksbiene's in their Off-Broadway run of Amerike the Golden Land which opened July 4, 2017 and performed for 6 weeks including a 2 weeks extension, closing August 20, 2017. She also performed in the Folksbiene's sold-out run of The Sorceress in December 2017, a performance as part of the Folksbiene's restoration process. Her Yiddish language skills are described by the Folksbiene's artistic director Zalman Mlotek as "a joy."

In Spring of 2018, she appeared in the concert 'Rise Too: Our Story' a benefit performance for arthritis at the Davenport Theatre. In the summer of 2018, Stephanie Lynne performed in the  premiere of Fidler Afn Dakh as Hodel at the Folksbiene – continuing with the show as it won the Drama Desk Award for Best Revival of a Musical in June, 2019.

Stage credits

References

External links

Living people
American stage actresses
Year of birth missing (living people)
Place of birth missing (living people)
21st-century American women